The 1977–78 Eastern Counties League season was the 36th in the history of Eastern Counties Football League a football competition in England.

At the end of the season the league was renamed The Town & Country League.

League table

The league featured 21 clubs which competed in the league last season, no new clubs joined the league this season.

League table

References

External links
 Eastern Counties Football League

1977-78
1977–78 in English football leagues